Andrey Alyaksandravich Harbunow ((Andrey Aleksandrovich Gorbunov); born 29 May 1983) is a Belarusian former professional footballer who played as a goalkeeper.

Career
Gorbunov made his debut for the Belarus national team on 30 March 2015, in a friendly match against Gabon.

On 17 May 2017, he ended his contract with Atromitos F.C. after three consecutive years with the club.

Honours
BATE Borisov
Belarusian Premier League champion: 2012, 2013
Belarusian Super Cup winner: 2013

References

External links 

1983 births
Living people
People from Mogilev
Sportspeople from Mogilev Region
Belarusian footballers
Association football goalkeepers
Belarus international footballers
Super League Greece players
FC Dnepr Mogilev players
FC Veino players
FC Spartak Shklov players
FC Dinamo Minsk players
FC Neman Grodno players
FC BATE Borisov players
Atromitos F.C. players
FC Torpedo-BelAZ Zhodino players
Belarusian expatriate footballers
Expatriate footballers in Greece